The McLeod River is a river in the Central Interior of British Columbia, Canada, flowing northeast into the north end of McLeod Lake.

References

Rivers of British Columbia
Cariboo Land District